Roger Hobbs  (June 10, 1988 – November 14, 2016) was an American writer. He was the author of Ghostman and Vanishing Games. In 2011, Hobbs sold the adaptation rights to his crime fiction Ghostman to Warner Brothers. In 2014, Hobbs was nominated for the Edgar Award for Best First Novel by an American Author. Roger Hobbs died of a drug overdose in Portland, Oregon, on November 14, 2016.

 
 
• In Italia: Hobbs, Roger (2013) L'ombra. Einaudi.  (2015) Pronti a svanire.  Einaudi.

Biography 
Roger John Hobbs was born June 10, 1988 in Boston as the only son of Randy and Renee Hobbs. He attended elementary school in Harvard, MA and graduated from Conestoga High School in the Tredyffrin-Easttown school district, a suburb of Philadelphia. Roger was a masterful storyteller who achieved considerable success in the craft of writing at an early age. While still in high school, Roger's one-act play, "Not Another Divine Comedy" won the Pittsburgh New Works Festival and was performed by the Open Stage Company in 2007. His essay on growing up with online media, "Instant Message, Instant Girlfriend," was published by the New York Times in 2008. Roger developed his interest in the noir genre at Reed College, where he graduated with a major in English in 2011. He wrote his senior thesis on the narratology of suspense in the mysteries of Edgar Allan Poe, working under the supervision of Professor Robert Knapp. Roger's friends also knew him as a talented composer and performer of tabletop role-playing games, including Eon, which was played at Reed College from 2007 to 2013.

In 2013, with the support of his agent Nat Sobel and his editor Gary Fisketjon, Roger's crime novel, "Ghostman," was published by Alfred A. Knopf. The book made the New York Times bestseller list and was translated into 20 different languages; Warner Bros. picked up the movie rights. In 2014, Roger's second book, Vanishing Games was published. Roger received numerous awards in recognition of his writing including the Ian Fleming Steel Dagger Award for Best Thriller, the Strand Critics Award for best first novel, and the Maltese Falcon Society Award for Best Hardboiled Novel. The New York Times critic Michiko Kakutani praised Roger as a gifted crime writer. Of Roger's untimely death, Bill Scott-Kerr, his British publisher said, "The sense of potential unfulfilled and just utter waste is a desolate one – his future was so sparkling a prospect and his talent so rare, it beggars belief that he won't be here to deliver on his promise."

References 

1988 births
2016 deaths
Writers from Boston
Reed College alumni
21st-century American novelists
American male novelists
Drug-related deaths in Oregon
21st-century American male writers
Novelists from Massachusetts